Governor Proctor may refer to:

Fletcher D. Proctor (1860–1911), 51st Governor of Vermont
Mortimer R. Proctor (1889–1968), 66th Governor of Vermont
Redfield Proctor (1831–1908), 37th Governor of Vermont
Redfield Proctor Jr. (1879–1957), 59th Governor of Vermont